University of Alabama is a public research university in Tuscaloosa, Alabama part of University of Alabama System.

University of Alabama may also refer to:

University of Alabama at Birmingham
University of Alabama in Huntsville

See also
University of Alabama in Huntsville shooting